Al Maha is the Arabic word for the Arabian oryx. 

Al Maha may also refer to:

 Al Maha Airways, a defunct airline based in Saudi Arabia
 Al Maha Petroleum, an oil company based in Oman